The Heroine is a novel by Eaton Stannard Barrett, first published in 1813. 

Cherry Wilkinson, a fatuous female protagonist with a history of novel-reading, fancies herself as the heroine of a Gothic romance. She perceives and models reality according to the stereotypes and typical plot structures of the Gothic novel, leading to a series of absurd events culminating in catastrophe. After her downfall, her affectations and excessive imaginations become eventually subdued by the voice of reason in the form of Stuart, a paternal figure, under whose guidance the protagonist receives a sound education and correction of her misguided taste.

References

19th-century British novels
Irish Gothic novels
Parody novels
1813 novels